John Farrow (1904–1963) was an Australian-born American film director and screenwriter.

John Farrow may also refer to:

 John Farrow (baseball) (1853–1914), 19th century baseball player
 John Farrow (skeleton racer) (born 1982), Australian skeleton racer
 John Charles Farrow (born 1946), brother of Mia Farrow
 Trevor Ferguson (born 1947), aka John Farrow, Canadian author

See also 
 Jonathan Farrow (born 1984), cricketer